Tarigidia is a genus of South African and Puerto Rican plants in the grass family.

Some authors have suggested that the genus might be of hybrid origin: Anthephora × Digitaria.

 Species
 Tarigidia aequiglumis (Gooss.) Stent - Namibia, Free State, North West Province
 Tarigidia axelrodii A.S.Vega & Rúgolo - Puerto Rico

References

Grassbase - The World Online Grass Flora

Poaceae genera
Panicoideae